USS Jean Sands was a steamer acquired by the Union Navy during the American Civil War. She was used by the Union Navy as a tugboat and salvage vessel in support of the Union Navy.

Service career 
Jean Sands was built at Brooklyn, New York, in 1863 and was purchased by the Navy at New York City from T. F. Rowland 18 October 1864. She was stationed at the Norfolk Navy Yard where she served as a tug and salvage vessel.  Jean Sands was sold 16 May 1892.

References 

Ships built in Brooklyn
1863 ships
Ships of the Union Navy
Steamships of the United States Navy
Tugs of the United States Navy
Unique rescue and salvage ships of the United States Navy